This list of museums and monuments in Istanbul, Turkey, includes the relevant architectural entities within Istanbul's city limits.

(in alphabetical order; Turkish-language name in parentheses where appropriate)

Related lists

List of architectural structures in Istanbul
List of columns and towers in Istanbul
List of Byzantine monuments in Istanbul
List of Istanbulites
List of libraries in Istanbul
List of mayors of Istanbul
List of schools in Istanbul
List of urban centers in Istanbul
List of universities in Istanbul

External links 

Lists of buildings and structures in Turkey
Istanbul
Istanbul-related lists
!
!